The 11th Congress of the Philippines (Filipino: Ikalabing-isang Kongreso ng Pilipinas), composed of the Philippine Senate and House of Representatives, met from July 27, 1998, until June 8, 2001, during the 31-month presidency of Joseph Estrada and the first four months of Gloria Macapagal Arroyo's presidency. The convening of the 11th Congress followed the 1998 national elections, which replaced half of the Senate membership, and the entire membership of the House of Representatives. The Estrada impeachment was the highlight of the 11th Congress.

Sessions 
 First Regular Session: July 27, 1998 – June 4, 1999
 First Special Session: January 4 – February 5, 1999
 Second Regular Session: July 26, 1999 – June 9, 2000
 Second Special Session: January 3 – February 4, 2000
 Third Regular Session: July 24, 2000 – June 8, 2001
 Third Special Session: January 1 – February 16, 2001

Legislation 
Laws passed by the 11th Congress:

Leadership

Senate 
 President of the Senate
Marcelo Fernan (LAMMP) (1998–1999)
Blas Ople (LAMMP)(1999–2000)
Franklin Drilon (LAMMP) (2000)
Aquilino Pimentel Jr. (PDP–Laban) (2000–2001)
 Senate President Pro-Tempore
Blas Ople (LAMMP) (1998–1999)
John Henry Osmeña (LAMMP) (1999–2000)
Blas Ople (LAAMP) (2000–2001)
 Majority Floor Leader
Franklin Drilon (LAMMP) (1998–2000)
Francisco Tatad (Gabay Bayan) (2000–2001)
Loren Legarda (Lakas-NUCD-UMDP) (2001)
 Minority Floor Leader
Teofisto Guingona (Lakas-NUCD-UMDP) (1998–2001)
Francisco Tatad (Gabay Bayan)(2001)

House of Representatives 
 Speaker of the House of Representatives
Manuel B. Villar Jr. (LAMMP), Lone District Las Piñas
Arnulfo P. Fuentabella (LAMMP), 3rd District Camarines Sur, elected on November 13, 2000
Feliciano R. Belmonte Jr. (Lakas-NUCD-UMDP), 4th District Quezon City, elected on January 24, 2001
 Deputy Speakers
 Luzon:   
 Visayas: Erico Aumentado, (Lakas-NUCD-UMDP), 2nd District of Bohol
 Mindanao: Daisy Fuentes, (LAMMP), 2nd District of South Cotabato
 Majority Floor Leader
Eduardo Gullas, LAMMP, 1st District of Cebu
 Minority Floor Leader
Feliciano R. Belmonte Jr. (Lakas-NUCD-UMDP), 4th District Quezon City
Arnulfo P. Fuentebella (NPC), 3rd District Camarines Sur, elected on January 24, 2001

Members

Composition 

*part of the LAMMP coalition.

Senate 

Notes

House of Representatives 
The term of office of the current members of the House of Representatives is from June 30, 1998, to June 30, 2001.

District representatives 

Notes

Sectoral representatives

See also 
 Congress of the Philippines
 Senate of the Philippines
 House of Representatives of the Philippines
 1998 Philippine general election

References

External links

Further reading 
 Philippine House of Representatives Congressional Library
 
 

Congresses of the Philippines
Fifth Philippine Republic